Vixotrigine, formerly known as raxatrigine, is an analgesic which is under development by Convergence Pharmaceuticals for the treatment of lumbosacral radiculopathy (sciatica) and trigeminal neuralgia (TGN). Vixotrigine was originally claimed to be a selective central Nav1.3 blocker, but was subsequently redefined as a selective peripheral Nav1.7 blocker. Following this, vixotrigine was redefined once again, as a non-selective voltage-gated sodium channel blocker. As of January 2018, it is in phase III clinical trials for trigeminal neuralgia and is in phase II clinical studies for erythromelalgia and neuropathic pain. It was previously under investigation for the treatment of bipolar disorder, but development for this indication was discontinued.

See also 
 List of investigational analgesics

References

External links 
 Vixotrigine - AdisInsight

Analgesics
Carboxamides
Enantiopure drugs
Pyrrolidines
Sodium channel blockers